Danilo Giacinto Ventola (born 11 September 2000) is an Italian professional footballer who plays as a forward for  club Fidelis Andria on loan from Ascoli.

Club career

Ascoli
Ventola started playing for the Under-19 squad of Ascoli in the 2016–17 season. In March 2018 he received five call-ups to the senior squad of Ascoli, but did not see any field time.

Loan to Genoa
On 17 August 2018, he signed a three-year professional contract with Ascoli and joined Serie A club Genoa on loan with a purchase option. He played for Genoa's Under-19 squad in the 2018–19 season, without any call-ups to the senior squad.

Genoa

Loan to Rimini
On 3 August 2019, Ventola joined Serie C club Rimini on a season-long loan.

He made his professional Serie C debut for Rimini on 21 September 2019 in a game against Carpi. He started the game and was substituted at half-time.

Return to Ascoli

Loan to Imolese
On 29 August 2020, he was loaned by Serie C club Imolese.

Loan to Turris
On 28 January 2021, he moved on loan to Serie C club Turris until the end of the 2020–21 season.

Loan to Virtus Francavilla
On 20 August 2021, he joined Virtus Francavilla on loan.

Loans to Recanatese and Fidelis Andria
On 19 July 2022, Ventola was loaned to Recanatese. On 6 January 2023, he moved on a new loan to Fidelis Andria.

Personal life
He is a nephew of former player Nicola Ventola.

References

External links
 

2000 births
People from Brindisi
Sportspeople from the Province of Brindisi
Footballers from Apulia
Living people
Italian footballers
Association football forwards
Ascoli Calcio 1898 F.C. players
Rimini F.C. 1912 players
Imolese Calcio 1919 players
Virtus Francavilla Calcio players
U.S.D. Recanatese 1923 players
S.S. Fidelis Andria 1928 players
Serie C players